Dobrynin is a village in Poland. Dobrynin may also refer to
 Dobrynin (surname)
Mount Dobrynin in Antarctica
 Dobrynin VD-4K, a Soviet piston engine
Dobrynin RD-7, a Soviet turbojet engine